The 1990 Portland Timbers season was the tenth season for a club bearing the Portland Timbers name.

Squad  
The 1990 squad

American Professional Soccer League

West Conference, North Division standings 

Pld = Matches played; W = Matches won; L = Matches lost; GF = Goals for; GA = Goals against; GD = Goal difference; Pts = PointsSource: [1]

References

1990
American soccer clubs 1990 season
1990 in sports in Oregon
1990 in Portland, Oregon